Thorsten Wittek (born 31 December 1976 in Berlin) is a German footballer who last played for CS Grevenmacher.

Career 
He made his debut on the professional league level in the Bundesliga for Bayer 04 Leverkusen on 20 October 2001 when he came on as a substitute in the 87th minute in a game against VfB Stuttgart.

Honours
Bayer Leverkusen
 UEFA Champions League finalist: 2001–02
 Bundesliga runner-up: 2001–02
 DFB-Pokal finalist: 2001–02

References

1976 births
Living people
German footballers
Bayer 04 Leverkusen players
Bayer 04 Leverkusen II players
SV Elversberg players
SV Eintracht Trier 05 players
Bundesliga players
Footballers from Berlin
Association football midfielders